Guillaume Kasbarian (born 28 February 1987) is a French business consultant and politician of La République En Marche (LREM) who has been serving as a member of the French National Assembly since the 2017 elections, representing the department of Eure-et-Loir.

Education and early career
The son of two civil servants of Armenian descent, Kasbarian graduated from the ESSEC Business School in 2010. He subsequently worked as a consultant in a Parisian strategy consulting firm.

Political career

Early beginnings
Kasbarian was the local representative of En Marche! for the Eure-et-Loir from December 2016 to June 2017.

Member of the National Assembly, 2017–present
Kasbarian was elected deputy of the 1st constituency of Eure-et-Loir on 18 June 2017, after his victory over Franck Masselus in the second round of legislative elections. 

In parliament, Kasbarian has been serving as member of the Committee on Economic Affairs since 2017; he became the committee’s chair after the legislative elections. In addition to his committee assignments, he is part of the parliamentary friendship groups with Armenia and South Africa.

Since November 2017, Kasbarian has been part of LREM's executive board under the leadership of the party's successive chairmen Christophe Castaner and Stanislas Guerini.

Political positions
In July 2019, Kasbarian voted in favor of the French ratification of the European Union's Comprehensive Economic and Trade Agreement (CETA) with Canada.

See also
 2017 French legislative election

References

1987 births
Living people
Deputies of the 15th National Assembly of the French Fifth Republic
Deputies of Eure-et-Loir
La République En Marche! politicians
Politicians from Marseille
ESSEC Business School alumni
Deputies of the 16th National Assembly of the French Fifth Republic